Henry Adjei-Darko (born 28 February 1983), also known as Henry Darko is a Ghanaian former professional tennis player.

Biography
Adjei-Darko, who grew up in Accra, was a right-handed serve and volley player. As a junior he competed in grand slam events, including the 2001 US Open, where he made the quarter-finals of the doubles. He turned professional aged 20 and was based in Atlanta during his career.

Between 2001 and 2012, Adjei-Darko featured in a total of 25 Davis Cup ties for Ghana. Overall he won 23 matches, 17 of which came in singles.

Adjei-Darko played mostly in ITF Futures tournaments and reached a career high singles ranking of 275 in the world. At ITF level he won seven singles and five doubles titles. 

While on the tour he also featured in the occasional Challenger event and was a semi-finalist at Orlando in 2005. His only Challenger title came in doubles, at Joplin in 2006.

Adjei-Darko took part in the qualifying draw for the 2006 Wimbledon Championships.

Future and Challenger finals

Singles: 9 (7–2)

Doubles 16 (8–8)

References

External links
 
 
 

1983 births
Living people
Ghanaian male tennis players
Sportspeople from Accra
Ghanaian expatriates in the United States